Kim Ye-won (born August 23, 1997) is a South Korean actress.

Filmography

Television series

Film

Awards and nominations

References

External links
 
 

1997 births
Living people
21st-century South Korean actresses
South Korean child actresses
South Korean television actresses
South Korean film actresses